The 2016 Oklahoma Sooners baseball team represents the University of Oklahoma during the 2016 NCAA Division I baseball season. The Sooners play their home games at L. Dale Mitchell Baseball Park as a member of the Big 12 Conference. They are led by head coach Pete Hughes, in his third season at Oklahoma.

Previous season
The 2015 Oklahoma Sooners baseball team notched a 34–27 (13–11) record and finished fourth in the Big 12 Conference standings. The Sooners reached the 2015 Big 12 Conference baseball tournament semifinal, where they were eliminated by Oklahoma State. Oklahoma did not receive an at-large bid to the 2015 NCAA Division I baseball tournament.

Personnel

Roster

Coaching staff

Schedule and results

All rankings from Collegiate Baseball.

Rankings

References

Oklahoma Sooners
Oklahoma Sooners baseball seasons